Anneliese Probst (married name in 2nd marriage Anneliese Seidler) (23 March 1926 – 10 October 2011) was a German writer.

Life 
Born in Düsseldorf, Probst had lived in Halle (Saale) since 1933. She attended a Gymnasium, where she passed the Abitur in 1944. In the same year, she married the lawyer Matthias Probst. Three children were born. From 1946, Anneliese Probst wrote literary works. In 1952/53 she worked as a dramaturge for the DEFA children's film studio. After the death of her first husband, she married the pastor Christof Seidler in 1971. She became a member of the CDU and was city councillor. In 1978 the couple moved to Beesenstedt, where Seidler worked as a pastor until 1994. After the death of her second husband in 1997, Anneliese Probst lived in a retirement home in  near Halle (Saale).

Probst was the author of children's books and youth books and also of novels for adults. From the 1960s, her works appeared mainly in the confessional publishing houses "Evangelische Verlagsanstalt" and "". Her works made 1.7 million copies.

Probst was a member of the Deutscher Schriftstellerverband. In 1990, she was one of the co-founders of the "Förderkreis der Schriftsteller in Sachsen-Anhalt". She drew the ideas for her books from her everyday experience, but also from overheard sentences or notes from the newspaper, and from confronting and dealing with problems in the course of her city council duties. She named her basic motive: "Let us not love with words, but with deeds and with truth".

In 1986, she was awarded the Handel Prize of the Halle District.

Work 

 Der unsterbliche Kaschtschej, Halle (Saale) 1947
 Der Zauberfisch, Halle (Saale) 1947
 Die steinerne Blume, Halle (Saale) 1948
 Das Zauberkorn. Der "singende Vogel". Die Wunderblume, Halle (S.) 1948
 Die Gazelle, Halle (S.) 1949
 Das Wunderpferdchen und andere russische Volksmärchen, Halle (Saale) 1950
 Schnurz, Berlin 1953 (together with Edith Müller-Beeck)
 Sagen und Märchen aus dem Harz, Berlin 1954
 Der steinerne Mühlmann, Berlin 1954 (with Kurt Bortfeldt)
 Schulgeschichten, Berlin 1955
 Sommertage, Berlin 1955
 Gespenstergeschichten, Berlin 1956
 Der steinerne Mühlmann, Berlin 1956
 Begegnung am Meer, Weimar 1957
 Ferien mit Susanne, Rodenkirchen/Köln 1957
 Sagen und Märchen aus Thüringen, Berlin 1957
 Die Geigerin, Berlin 1958
 Einsteigen bitte!, Berlin 1959
 Geschichten aus der 3a, Berlin 1960
 Ich … und Du, Berlin 1960
 Sabine und Martin, Berlin 1960
 Nein, diese Hanne!, Berlin 1961
 Wir brauchen euch beide, Berlin 1962
 Altweibersommer, Berlin 1964
 Die fröhliche Insel, Berlin 1964
 Menschen in der Heiligen Nacht, Berlin 1965
 Reifeprüfung, Berlin 1965
 Schatten, Berlin 1965
 Die verborgene Schuld, Berlin 1966
 Die letzten großen Ferien, Berlin 1967
 Die Pause, Berlin 1969
 Das Wiedersehen und andere Erzählungen über die Kunst, in Gelassenheit alt zu werden, Berlin 1970
 Menschen wie ich und du, Berlin 1971
 Die schöne Kuline, Berlin 1971
 Träumen mit der Feder, Berlin 1971
 Das Fräulein vom Hochhaus, Berlin 1972
 Ein Zeltschein für Dierhagen, Berlin 1972
 Die fünf aus Nr. 19, Berlin 1974
 Vergiß die kleinen Schritte nicht, Berlin 1974
 Die Christvesper oder Das Weihnachtsläuten von St. Martin, Berlin 1975
 Das weiße Porzellanpferd, Berlin 1976
 Die unentwegte Großmutter, Berlin 1978
 Karlchen oder Die Geschichte von der Eisernen Hochzeit, Berlin 1979
 Nenni kündigt nicht, Berlin 1980
 Die Legende vom Engel Ambrosio, Berlin 1981
 Unterwegs nach Gutwill, Berlin 1982
 Rund um den Taubenturm, Berlin 1984
 Stationen, Berlin 1984
 Hinkefüßchen, Niederwiesa 1986
 Orchesterprobe, Berlin 1986
 Lieber Gott, hörst du mich?, Constance 1987
 Annettes Stern, Berlin 1989
 Traumtänzerin, Berlin 1991
 Mein Wintertagebuch, Gößnitz 1995
 Anneliese Probst, Halle 1996
 Von Whisky, Wodka und anderen Lieblingen, Querfurt 1996
 Das lange Gespräch, Querfurt 1999
 Auf der Suche nach dem Kind, Leipzig 2000
 Steh-auf-Lieschen, Querfurt 2000
 Die steinerne Blume, Leipzig 2001
 Katzensommer, Querfurt 2003
 Tobias Kullerauge und andere Gute-Nacht-Geschichten, Halle 2005

Awards  
 Handel Prize

References

Further reading

External links 
 Anneliese Probst auf den Seiten des Förderkreises der Schriftsteller in Sachsen-Anhalt
 

1926 births
2011 deaths
Writers from Düsseldorf
20th-century German writers
21st-century German writers
German children's writers
German women children's writers
Christian Democratic Union (East Germany) politicians
Handel Prize winners
20th-century German women
21st-century German women